Jerome Albert Evans Jr., known as Silkski, was an American rapper, songwriter, and music producer who is known from his affiliation with Ol' Dirty Bastard (ODB) and the Wu-Tang Clan, whose affiliates are known as the Wu-Tang Killa Beez. Silkski is a PYN, Wu-Tang Management, Da Gutta Ent., Bungalo, Street Scholar, Universal Music Group artist and was a member of Brooklyn Zu. Silkski died October 28, 2016. He is survived by his wife Linnette Evans (Diamond), and four kids: Octavia Evans, Gauvauen Evans, Heidie Workneh, and Shadé Evans.

Biography 

While appearing in many Wu-related events, Silkski made appearances on Vh1 “Inside out, ODB on Parole”; “The Disciples Of The 36 Chambers” (DVD) concert from ODB’s last major Wutang concert July 17, 2004, before ODB's death; “Rock the Bells” movie documentary of the same concert now on DVD; The Wu-Tang Story, and documentary Dirty, One Word Can Change The World; and BET’s “Access Granted” with Ghostface and RZA from Ghostface featuring Missy Elliott “Tush” video. Silkski featured on albums, done out of the United States, such as Neplatna Identita Hodne Tvari / Many Faces; 10th Anniversary (CD Collector); and Russia Vs USA “Spy Games” Wu Edition, Compiled By WTCF.

In 1995, Silkski performed and produced the song “Techno Boy” for the movie score and soundtrack of the film Copycat. The film grossed $32,051,917 in the United States, and £2,023,443 in the UK.
In 1996, Silkski produced the song "Pimp'n Ain't EZ" for the movie and soundtrack of the 1996 animated feature film Beavis and Butt-head Do America, which grossed $20.11 million in its opening weekend, and grossed over $127,118,386 in North American box office sales. Silkski also produced songs that went over platinum on the Bloods & Crips "Bangin' on Wax” albums, as well as an album for Ice-T that went gold.

Silkski family is well connected into the music industry, but that didn't give him his start in the industry. “She (Silkski’s mom) tried to keep me in the nice area”, said Silkski, “but I went the other way.””
As a child Silkski cut school and sneak into the movies in Time Square on 42nd street or Broadway; jump on back of moving commercial trucks to get a tow home; hop the train; and would often Hang ten on the subways that went over 100 miles an hour between stops. On the A train express that went non-stop from 59th Street in mid-town Manhattan to 125th Street and Broadway in Harlem; he would hang off the back of the train on the last car for a thrill ride, holding on to nothing but the door knob with his feet barely touching the platform. With his stunts and rebelliousness, it led to one of the most defining moments in Silkski’s life; his mother turned him over to the state. His mother put him in a group home in Staten Island (Mount Lorreto) “Mission of the Immaculate Virgin”. Eventually, Silkski left the group home and moved in with his cousin who lived in the roughest area of Jamaica Queens. While in Jamaica Queens, Silkski along with others contributed to the negativity of Queens inner city streets. Although he lived in a grimey area, he stood out with his extreme tagging graffiti techniques and style of dancing, which led him to be nicknamed "Kid Boogie". During Silkski's adolescence and preteen years, he was known as the kid with the sleepy eyes. People around him would call him sleepy because his eyes use to droop down or appear as if he was high or falling asleep. But at the age of 12 he decided that he wanted a nickname that sounded cool or slick. He chose the name Silk because older people use to say that he was smooth as silk; because he had the wavy hair, smooth talk, and swagger with the way he dressed. Although he liked the name Slick, he decided to go with Silk because it was cool, sounded slick, and at the time was original. During the early stages of hip hop; b-boys, emcees, d-jays and graffiti artist were giving themselves nicknames with a common tag at the end; which was a letter of the alphabet or something that gave that individual a swagger that represented a form of expression, a character, or alto ego of themselves. At that time, growing up, he would frequently wear ski jackets, ski hats, beanies, and ski goggles, because of the cold weather in New York, which in turn contributed to his persona and ultimately became a part of his name. He put the two words together “Silk and Ski”, and that is what formed the name Silkski.

Aside from living in Staten Island and Queens, Silkski lived in Manhattan, Brooklyn, and Harlem. While in Harlem, Silkski connected with B-boy dancer Larry Love of the Zulu Nation who was famous in Harlem for his unique dance known as the Float. As a B-boy, Silkski became known for his unique electric boogie style where he would vibrate his hands, legs, and body. Before Silkski connected with Larry Love, he changed his dance name from "Kid Boogie" to "Gangsta Boogie". Together, Silkski and Larry Love would battle dance different crews throughout the Burroughs of New York.
Larry Parker (Larry Love), known for the song "Larry's Dance Theme, by Grandmaster Flash and the Furious Five connected Silkski with the owner of Harlem World. At Harlem World, Silkski met Kurtis Blow. One day while Silski practiced his dance moves, Kurtis Blow went into the club to set up for a show. Silkski asked Kurtis Blow to watch him dance; and that same night, he was on stage dancing in the show.
Although Silkski lived in New York, he also had family on the west coast in Los Angeles, California. He would travel back and forth, bringing and taking new hip hop trends with him.
In Los Angeles, his good friend and cousin, Dougie D, reunited Silkski with Kurtis Blow, which led Kurtis to take Silkski on a forty-city European tour with him. After the tour, Silkski continued to work with Kurtis Blow for a number of years. He danced as a member of his crew, appeared in music videos, was a dee jay at major events, and worked behind the scenes as Kurtis Blow’s producer.
Later in California, Silkski joined Ice-T’s rap group Rhyme Syndicate.  He started as a rapper producing his own music, but his beats were considered so good that many artists and record labels wanted him to produce their tracks. He produced songs for the Bloods and Crips’ albums, produced songs for Geffen Records, Def Jam Recordings, PolyGram, Milan Records and was signed to Death Row Records under Char Jones as a producer. While at Death Row Records, at Can-Am Studios in Tarzana, California, he worked with Tupac Shakur, Snoop Dogg, The Lady of Rage, Kurupt and Daz Dillinger from Tha Dogg Pound, and many others until Tupac Shakur’s untimely passing.

Discography

Film 
 Rock the Bells (2006) Denis Hennelly, Casey Suchan
 Disciples Of The 36 Chambers (2004) Wu-Tang Clan
 “Gold Diggin' For Love of Money” A Documentary Film (2009) Brass Ring Enterprises

Television
 Howard Stern Show (2003) Howard Stern
 Upside Down TV (2003) Johnny Neurotic and Bridget "the Midget" Powerz
 The Roof T.V. (2003) (Telemundo)
 Access Granted "Tush" video Ghostface and Missy Elliott (2004) BET
 Inside out, ODB on Parole (2004) VH1

Music

Albums and singles

References

External links

 

American male rappers
American hip hop record producers
East Coast hip hop musicians
Wu-Tang Clan affiliates
Rappers from New York City
21st-century American rappers
Record producers from New York (state)
Year of birth missing
2016 deaths